Nata pratha is an ancient local custom in Rajasthan, whereby a married man can legitimize an affair with a married woman by formally providing financial support for her.

See also
 Maitri Karar

Reference

Indian traditions